Ieuan David Lloyd (born 9 July 1993) is a Welsh competitive swimmer. He competed in both the 2012 London Olympics and the 2016 Rio Olympics for Team GB.

Biography
Born just outside Cardiff in 1993, Lloyd found his enthusiasm for swimming early on. At the age of 11 he attended Stanwell School where he stayed until completing his A-levels in 2011, obtaining A grades in Chemistry, Biology and Maths. He now lives in the city of Cardiff. He is proficient in both English and Welsh.

In 2009 he competed in the European Youth Olympic Festival in Tampere, Finland, winning Gold in the under-16s men's 200m individual medley at the age of 15.

He competed at the 2012 Summer Olympics in the Men's 200 metre freestyle, finishing in 19th place in the heats, failing to qualify for the semifinals. On 31 July he competed in the 4 × 200 m swimming relay race where the team qualified for the final but finished 6th with a time of 7 minutes 9.33 seconds, 9.63 seconds behind the winning USA team. In the 2016 Rio Olympics he made the semifinal of the 200 Individual Medley where he lined up with Michael Phelps and Ryan Lochte. He ended up finishing tenth overall.

In August 2012, Lloyd "photobombed" British Prime Minister David Cameron at the end of the London 2012 Olympics parade.

References

1993 births
Living people
Sportspeople from Cardiff
Welsh male freestyle swimmers
Olympic swimmers of Great Britain
Swimmers at the 2012 Summer Olympics
Swimmers at the 2016 Summer Olympics